Al-Karabah is a sub-district located in Al Qafr District, Ibb Governorate, Yemen. Al-Karabah had a population of  1646 as of 2004.

References 

Sub-districts in Al Qafr District